Albert Edward Mays (18 April 1929 – 5 July 1973) was a Welsh professional footballer who played as a wing half. Mays was also an amateur cricketer.

Football career
Born in Ynyshir, Mays played for Derby County, Chesterfield and Burton Albion.

Cricket career
Mays played for the 2nd team of the Derbyshire County Cricket Club.

References

1929 births
1973 deaths
Welsh footballers
Welsh cricketers
Derby County F.C. players
Chesterfield F.C. players
Burton Albion F.C. players
English Football League players
Association football wing halves